Messier 66 or M66, also known as NGC 3627, is an intermediate spiral galaxy in the southern, equatorial half of Leo. It was discovered by French astronomer Charles Messier on 1 March 1780, who described it as "very long and very faint". This galaxy is a member of a small group of galaxies that includes M65 and NGC 3628, known as the Leo Triplet or the M66 Group. M65 and M66 are a common object for amateur astronomic observation, being separated by only .

M66 has a morphological classification of SABb, indicating a spiral shape with a weak bar feature and loosely wound arms. The isophotal axis ratio is 0.32, indicating that it is being viewed at an angle. It lies 31 million light-years away and is about 95 thousand light-years across with striking dust lanes and bright star clusters along sweeping spiral arms. As of 2018, five supernovae have been observed in M66: SN 2016cok, 2009hd, 1997bs, 1989B, and 1973R. The one detected in 2016, SN 2016cok was discovered by the All Sky Automated Survey for Supernovae, and it has been  categorized as a Type IIp supernova.

Gravitational interaction from its past encounter with neighboring NGC 3628 has resulted in an extremely high central mass concentration; a high molecular to atomic mass ratio; and a resolved non-rotating clump of H I material apparently removed from one of the spiral arms. The latter feature shows up visually as an extremely prominent and unusual spiral arm and dust lane structures as originally noted in the Atlas of Peculiar Galaxies.

Gallery

See also
 List of Messier objects

References

External links

 Spiral Galaxy M66
 Astronomy Picture of the Day – Unusual Spiral Galaxy M66 from Hubble – 2010 April 13
 
 

Intermediate spiral galaxies
Messier 066
Messier 066
066
Messier 066
06346
34695
016
Astronomical objects discovered in 1780
Articles containing video clips